Philippi Glacier is coastal glacier about 15 mi long, flowing N to the E end of the West Ice Shelf, 15 mi W of Gaussberg.  Delineated from aerial photographs taken by U.S. Navy (USN) OpHjp, 1946–47.  Named by the ANCA for Emil Philippi, geologist with the German Antarctic Expedition (GerAE) under Erich von Drygalski, 1901–03, who made scientific observations in the vicinity of Gaussberg.

See also
 List of glaciers in the Antarctic
 Glaciology

References

Ice streams of Antarctica
Glaciers of Kaiser Wilhelm II Land